Coxcatlán or Coxcatlan may refer to:
 Coxcatlan Cave, an archaeological site in Puebla, Mexico
 Coxcatlán Municipality, Puebla
 Coxcatlán Municipality, San Luis Potosí
 Coxcatlán, Buenavista de Cuéllar
 Coxcatlán, Puebla

See also 
 Coxcatlán Municipality (disambiguation)